Hamiota may refer to:

 Hamiota Municipality, a rural municipality in Manitoba, Canada, formed by amalgamating:
 Hamiota, Manitoba, a former town
 Rural Municipality of Hamiota, a former rural municipality
 Hamiota (bivalve), a genus of molluscs